The women's 4×100 metre freestyle relay event at the 2000 Summer Olympics took place on 16 September at the Sydney International Aquatic Centre in Sydney, Australia.

The U.S. women's team dominated the race from the start to break the six-year-old world record and most importantly, to defend an Olympic title in the event. The foursome of Amy Van Dyken (55.08), Dara Torres (53.51), Courtney Shealy (54.40), and Jenny Thompson (53.62) put together a stellar time of 3:36.61 to capture the relay gold medal, shaving off China's 1994 world record by 1.3 seconds. As the Americans celebrated their triumph in the pool, Thompson picked up her eighth career medal to become the nation's most successful woman in Olympic history. She also tied with former East Germany's Kristin Otto for the most golds by a female, a total of six.

The Netherlands nearly pulled a worst-to-first effort, building from an eighth-place turn by Manon van Rooijen (56.35), seventh by Wilma van Rijn (55.19), and sixth by Thamar Henneken (54.88) until they delivered rising star Inge de Bruijn for the final exchange. Swimming the anchor leg, De Bruijn surged powerfully past the entire field with a fastest split of 53.41 to take home the silver for the Dutch in a European record of 3:39.83. Meanwhile, Sweden's Louise Jöhncke (55.93), Therese Alshammar (53.78), Johanna Sjöberg (55.06), and Anna-Karin Kammerling (55.58) came up with a spectacular swim to grab a bronze in 3:40.30, a national record, holding off a sprint battle from the fast-pacing German team of Antje Buschschulte (55.67), Katrin Meissner (54.92), Franziska van Almsick (55.02), and Sandra Völker (54.70) by a hundredth of a second.

Great Britain's Karen Pickering (56.01), Alison Sheppard (54.95), Rosalind Brett (54.92), and Sue Rolph (54.66) pulled off a fifth-place finish in 3:40.54. Susie O'Neill recorded a split of 54.79 to produce a powerful lead on the first length by the delight of a home crowd, but the Aussies settled only for sixth place with a time of 3:40.91. Canada (3:42.92) and Italy (3:44.49) rounded out the championship finale.

Records
Prior to this competition, the existing world and Olympic records were as follows.

The following new world and Olympic records were set during this competition.

Results

Heats

Final

References

External links
Official Olympic Report

F
4 × 100 metre freestyle relay
2000 in women's swimming
Women's events at the 2000 Summer Olympics